A Tale of Two Cities is the debut album by British musical group Mr Hudson and the Library, released on 5 March 2007. It is named after the Charles Dickens novel of the same name.

Track listing
 "On the Street Where You Live" (Alan Jay Lerner, Frederick Loewe)
 "Take Us Somewhere New"
 "Too Late Too Late"  (Brass by Nik Carter-Sax / Jack Birchwood-Trumpet and Steven Fuller-Trombone)
 "Everything Happens to Me" (Tom Adair, Matt Dennis)
 "Cover Girl"
 "Two by Two"
 "Bread & Roses"
 "Ask the DJ"
 "Picture of You"
 "One Specific Thing" (Ben Hudson, Robin French)
 "Ghosts"
 "Upon The Heath/A Tale of Two Cities [Remix]"

References

2007 debut albums
Mr Hudson albums
Albums produced by Jim Abbiss
Indie rock albums by British artists